Ross Rentea MD has been a practicing family physician in Chicago for over 25 years. He is an author, editor, physician of anthroposophical medicine and innovator.

Articles
Anthroposophical Aspects of Diabetes Treatment
Gold, Frankincense and Myrrh- Companions for Overcoming Work-Related Stress?
Sensory Overload
The Seven Life Processes
Spirituality in Substance (I) An Anthroposophical View of Gemstones

See also
Anthroposophical medicine
Naturopathy

References

External links
Interview with Ross Rentea (PDF), Alternative and Complementary Therapies, 12(1): 29-34, February 2006.
Physicians list, Physicians' Association for Anthroposophic Medicine.
True Botanica web site

American primary care physicians
Living people
Anthroposophic medicine practitioners
Year of birth missing (living people)